Mount Nuang is located in Malaysia with the height of . Its peak borders Pahang and Selangor state and is close to the Pahang-Selangor-Negeri Sembilan border tripoint. The mountain itself is the third highest point in Selangor after Mts. Semangkok and Ulu Kali, and is part of the Titiwangsa Mountains.

There are three hiking routes to the peak and all of them were built by Malaysian Department of Wildlife and National Parks. Two of them start in Selangor; one at Kuala Pangsoon in Hulu Langat and another at Kampung Kemensah in Gombak. The third path originates from Bukit Tinggi in Bentong, Pahang. Genting Highlands is visible at night from the peak. On the Kuala Pangsoon rout, the climb involves a two-hour hike on a very steep road, then an optional stop at "Camp Lolo", and after that there is a six-hour push to the peak, and a four-hour trek to the ground.

Gallery

See also
 Bukit Tabur (Taman Melawati Hill)
 List of mountains in Malaysia

References 

Nuang
Nature sites of Selangor
Nuang
Nuang